Merrill High School may refer to:
Merrill High School (Arkansas) in Pine Bluff, Arkansas
Merrill High School (Michigan) in Merrill, Michigan
Merrill High School (Oregon) in Merrill, Oregon
Merrill High School (Wisconsin) in Merrill, Wisconsin
Merrill Junior High School in Merrill, Iowa